

The Druine D.5 Turbi was a light aircraft designed in France in the 1950s for home building. It was a low-wing cantilever monoplane with fixed tailskid undercarriage. The pilot and a single passenger sat in tandem, open cockpits. Essentially a scaled-up version of the Druine Turbulent design, the Turbi shared that aircraft's wooden construction. Again, like its predecessor, it was intended to be able to be powered by a variety of air-cooled engines.

The aircraft was marketed as plans and as a kit by Falconar Avia of Edmonton, Alberta, Canada. Plans are now supplied by Manna Aviation of Australia.

Design
The Turbi is built using all-wood construction. The wing uses a two-spar design. It uses slotted ailerons.

Specifications (Druine D.5 Turbi)

References

External links

Official website

1950s French sport aircraft
Turbi
Homebuilt aircraft
Single-engined tractor aircraft
Low-wing aircraft
Aircraft first flown in 1953